Luuk Wouters (born 8 June 1999) is a Dutch professional football player who plays as a defender for RKC Waalwijk.

References

External links

 Career stats & Profile - Voetbal International

1999 births
Living people
Dutch footballers
Association football defenders
Willem II (football club) players
RKC Waalwijk players
Eredivisie players
People from Schijndel
Footballers from North Brabant